The Metropolis Project is an international network of researchers, policy-makers, international organizations and civil society organizations for the development of comparative research and policy-relevant knowledge on migration, diversity, and immigrant integration in cities in Canada and around the world.

The Metropolis Project's principal decision-making body is an International Steering Committee of representatives from over 40 countries. The Project is managed by a Secretariat with offices in Ottawa, Amsterdam and in Asia with functions distributed across organizations in Seoul, Manila and Beijing. The Ottawa Secretariat is responsible for establishing the Project's strategic directions.  Howard Duncan is the Project's Executive Head.

Metropolis Professional Development

The Metropolis Project launched in April 2014 a new training program for senior policy-makers, senior managers of settlement agencies, officials of international organizations and the private sector. The programme is intended to provide participants with information, analysis and tools on the management of migration and integration. A pilot training will be offered in June 2014. Metropolis Professional Development has been developed in collaboration with worldwide renowned experts such as Graeme Hugo (University of Adelaide), Jan Niessen (Migration Policy Group), Imelda Nicolas (Commission on Filipinos Overseas) and Peter Schatzer (IOM) among many others.

Publications

The Metropolis Project partners with Springer in the publication of an academic journal, the Journal of International Migration and Integration (Revue de l'intégration et de la migration internationale). It is published quarterly, in both English and French; its first issue was in Winter, 2000. The managing editor for the 2013-2014 issue is Lori Wilkinson of the University of Manitoba.

Annual Conference 
The project has hosted an international conference concerning research and policy on human migration annually since 1996. The 2015 meeting will be held in Mexico City, Mexico in September 2015 (Metropolis 2015 site) with the slogan "Migrants: Key Players in the 21st Century".

Previous conference locations have been:
2014 - Milan, Italy
2013 - Tampere, Finland
2012 - Auckland, New Zealand
2011 - Ponte Delgada, Azores, Portugal
2009 – Copenhagen, Denmark
2008 – Bonn, Germany
2007 – Melbourne, Australia 
2006 – Lisbon, Portugal
2005 – Toronto, Ontario, Canada
2004 – Geneva, Switzerland
2003 – Vienna, Austria
2002 – Oslo, Norway
2001 – Rotterdam, Netherlands
2000 – Vancouver, British Columbia, Canada
1999 – Washington D.C., United States
1998 – Zikhron Ya'akov, Israel
1997 – Copenhagen, Denmark
1996 – Milan, Italy

References

External links
Metropolis Project Website
Journal of International Migration and Integration

Human migration
Social sciences organizations